Erdem Şen (born 5 January 1989, in Brussels, Belgium) is a Belgian professional footballer of Turkish descent who most recently played as a midfielder for İstanbulspor.

Career
On 18 August 2016, Erdem Şen signed with Marítimo.

References

External links
Profile on Thefinalball.co.uk

1989 births
Living people
Belgian footballers
Turkish footballers
Belgian people of Turkish descent
Giresunspor footballers
Samsunspor footballers
Gaziantepspor footballers
C.S. Marítimo players
Primeira Liga players
FC Kreuzlingen players
MKE Ankaragücü footballers
G.D. Chaves players
Expatriate footballers in Portugal
Belgian expatriate footballers
Belgian expatriate sportspeople in Portugal
Turkish expatriate footballers
Turkish expatriate sportspeople in Portugal
R.C.S. Verviétois players
Association football midfielders